Martin Plüss is a former Swiss curler.

Teams

References

External links
 

Living people
Swiss male curlers
Swiss curling champions
Year of birth missing (living people)